The Riegle-Neal Interstate Banking and Branching Efficiency Act of 1994 [IBBEA] amended the laws governing federally chartered banks in order to restore the laws' competitiveness with the recently relaxed laws governing state-chartered banks. The goal was the return to a balance between the benefits of a state bank charter versus a federal bank charter. Among other notable changes, the Act stipulated that a federally chartered bank wishing to expand must first undergo a review of its Community Reinvestment Act compliance.

Expansion of the Community Reinvestment Act

Three sections of the IBBEA address and expand the Community Reinvestment Act.

In section 107 ("EQUALIZING COMPETITIVE OPPORTUNITIES FOR UNITED STATES AND FOREIGN BANKS"):
(f) MEETING COMMUNITY CREDIT NEEDS.
Section 5(a) of the International Banking Act of 1978 (12 U.S.C. 3103(a)) (as amended by section 104 of this Act) is amended by inserting after paragraph (7) the following new paragraph:
(8) CONTINUING REQUIREMENT FOR MEETING COMMUNITY CREDIT NEEDS AFTER INITIAL INTERSTATE ENTRY BY ACQUISITION.
(A) IN GENERAL.—If a foreign bank acquires a bank or a branch of a bank, in a State in which the foreign bank does not maintain a branch, and such acquired bank is, or is part of, a regulated financial institution (as defined in section 803 of the Community Reinvestment Act of 1977), the Community Reinvestment Act of 1977 shall continue to apply to each branch of the foreign bank which results from the acquisition as if such branch were a regulated financial institution.

In section 109 ("PROHIBITION AGAINST DEPOSIT PRODUCTION OFFICES"):
(b) GUIDELINES FOR MEETING CREDIT NEEDS. Regulations issued under subsection (a) shall include guidelines to ensure that interstate branches operated by an out-of-State bank in a host State are reasonably helping to meet the credit needs of the communities which the branches serve.
(c) LIMITATION ON OUT-OF-STATE LOANS.
(1) LIMITATION.—Regulations issued under subsection (a) shall require that, beginning no earlier than 1 year after establishment or acquisition of an interstate branch or branches in a host State by an out-of-State bank, if the appropriate Federal banking agency for the out-of-State bank determines that the bank’s level of lending in the host State relative to the deposits from the host State (as reasonably determinable from available information including the agency’s sampling of the bank’s loan files during an examination or such data as is otherwise available) is less than half the average of total loans in the host State relative to total deposits from the host State (as determinable from relevant sources) for all banks the home State of which is such State--
(A) the appropriate Federal banking agency for the out-of-State bank shall review the loan portfolio of the bank and determine whether the bank is reasonably helping to meet the credit needs of the communities served by the bank in the host State; and
(B) if the agency determines that the out-of-State bank is not reasonably helping to meet those needs
(i) the agency may order that an interstate branch or branches of such bank in the host State be closed unless the bank provides reasonable assurances to the satisfaction of the appropriate Federal banking agency that the bank has an acceptable plan that will reason ably help to meet the credit needs of the communities served by the bank in the host State, and
(ii) the out-of-State bank may not open a new interstate branch in the host State unless the bank provides reasonable assurances to the satisfaction of the appropriate Federal banking agency that the bank will reasonably help to meet the credit needs of the community that the new branch will serve.
[...]
(2) CONSIDERATIONS.—In making a determination under paragraph (1)(A), the appropriate Federal banking agency shall consider—
(A) whether the interstate branch or branches of the out-of-State bank were formerly part of a failed or failing depository institution;
(B) whether the interstate branch was acquired under circumstances where there was a low loan-to-deposit ratio because of the nature of the acquired institution’s business or loan portfolio;
(C) whether the interstate branch or branches of the out-of-State bank have a higher concentration of commercial or credit card lending, trust services, or other specialized activities;
(D) the ratings received by the out-of-State bank under the Community Reinvestment Act of 1977;
[...]

Section 110 ("COMMUNITY REINVESTMENT ACT EVALUATION OF BANKS WITH INTERSTATE BRANCHES") amends the Community Reinvestment Act itself to include a new section regarding the method of evaluating the compliance of banks with branches in more than one state.

Effect
Newly formed firms used less outside debt financing and invested less, suggesting that greater banking competition increased financial constraints for these firms. These effects diminished and ultimately reversed as firms aged.

References

http://www.ct.gov/dob/cwp/view.asp?a=2235&q=297892

103rd United States Congress
United States federal banking legislation
United States housing bubble
Mortgage industry of the United States
Community development
Urban economics
Urban politics in the United States
Mortgage legislation
Banking in the United States